The Metropolitan Opera House may refer to:

In the United States

New York City
Metropolitan Opera House (Lincoln Center)
Metropolitan Opera House (39th Street) ("the old Met")

Other US opera houses
 Metropolitan Opera House (Grand Forks, North Dakota)
 Metropolitan Opera House (Iowa Falls, Iowa)
 Metropolitan Opera House (Minneapolis)
 Metropolitan Opera House (Philadelphia)
 Metropolitan Opera House (Saint Paul, Minnesota)

In other countries
Metropolitan Opera House (Taichung, Taiwan), scheduled for full opening in 2016